Točník is a municipality and village in Beroun District in the Central Bohemian Region of the Czech Republic. It has about 300 inhabitants.

Sights
The municipality is known for the medieval Žebrák and Točník castles.

Gallery

References

Villages in the Beroun District